Rakott krumpli (or rarely rakott burgonya) is a Ukrainian and Hungarian dish made from potatoes, sour cream, smoked sausage, hard-cooked eggs, and bread crumbs. It is a layered casserole with slices of each ingredient layered onto each other, it was first mentioned in István Czifray's 1840 edition of the Magyar nemzeti szakácskönyv (Hungarian national cookbook). It can be served as a luncheon dish, as a main course or as a side dish.

See also
 Hungarian cuisine
 List of casserole dishes
 List of potato dishes

References 

Hungarian cuisine
Potato dishes
Casserole dishes
Sausage dishes